Borough Market is a wholesale and retail market hall in Southwark, London, England. It is one of the largest and oldest food markets in London, with a market on the site dating back to at least the 12th century. The present buildings were built in the 1850s, and today the market mainly sells specialty foods to the general public.

History

The market itself claims to have existed since 1014 "and probably much earlier" as Snorri Sturluson describes Southwark as a "great market town" when describing an incident in Heimskringla dated to 1014. A market that originally adjoined the end of London Bridge was first mentioned in 1276 and was subsequently moved south of St Margaret's church on the High Street. The City of London received a royal charter from Edward VI in 1550 to control all markets in Southwark (see Guildable Manor), which was confirmed by Charles II in 1671. However, the market caused such traffic congestion that, in 1754, it was abolished by an Act of Parliament.

The Act allowed for the local parishioners to set up another market on a new site, and in 1756, it began again on a 4.5-acre (18,000 m2) site in Rochester Yard. During the 19th century, it became one of London's most important food markets due to its strategic position near the riverside wharves of the Pool of London.

By the mid 1990s the market had declined and trustees decided to revive it as a retail rather than a wholesale market. In 1998 they invited Henrietta Green to hold a Food Lovers' Fair, which recruited several long-term traders for the market. From 1996 they let unused space to wholesale businesses such as Neal's Yard Dairy, Brindisa and Monmouth Coffee Company. The new tenants were encouraged to open their premises to retail customers.

In 2011, seven traders were expelled from the market for trading from their storage units at Maltby Street Market a mile away. In turn the traders criticised poor facilities at the market and a move to selling takeaway food.

In the 2017 London Bridge attack, three attackers drove a vehicle over London Bridge and then ran to the area, where they stabbed and killed eight people with knives before they were shot dead by armed police. The market was then closed for 11 days following the attack.

Information
Borough Market is located on Southwark Street and Borough High Street just south of Southwark Cathedral on the southern end of London Bridge.

The retail market operates 7 days a week: Monday to Thursday from 10 a.m. to 5 p.m., Fridays from 10 a.m. to 6 p.m., Saturdays from 8 a.m. to 5 p.m and Sundays from 10 a.m to 3 p.m The wholesale market operates on all weekday mornings from 2 a.m. to 8 a.m.

Architecture

The present buildings were designed in 1851 by Henry Rose, with additions in the 1860s and an entrance designed in the Art Deco style added on Southwark Street in 1932. Significant changes to the buildings have been made over the years as a result of successive expansions to the nearby railway infrastructure; see "Railway viaducts and the Thameslink Programme".

A refurbishment began in 2001. The Work  includes the re-erection in 2004 of the South Portico from the Floral Hall, previously at Covent Garden, which was dismantled when the Royal Opera House was reconstructed in the 1990s. The original Convent Garden building was listed and the resited portico was Grade II listed in 2008.

Trade
The present-day market mainly sells speciality foods to the general public. However, in the 20th century, it was essentially a wholesale market, selling produce in quantity to greengrocers. It was the main supplier, along with Covent Garden, of fruits and vegetables to retail greengrocers' shops. Amongst the notable businesses trading in the market were Vitacress, Lee Brothers (potato merchants whose signage can still be seen in the market), Manny Sugarman,  AW Bourne and Eddy Robbins. JO Sims, the main importer for South African citrus fruit (Outspan), were also located in the market.

Stallholders come to trade at the market from different parts of the UK, and traditional European products are also imported and sold. Amongst the produce on sale are fresh fruit and vegetables, cheese, meat, game, baked bread and pastries. 

The market is a charitable trust administered by a board of volunteer trustees, who have to live in the area.

Borough Market and the surrounding streets have been used as a film location for such features as Bridget Jones's Diary (2001), Lock, Stock and Two Smoking Barrels (1998) and Harry Potter and the Prisoner of Azkaban (2004). More recently some scenes in The Imaginarium of Doctor Parnassus (2009) were shot there. As reported by the London Evening Standard, the market is available to hire for private events.

Railway viaducts and the Thameslink Programme

From 1860, the railway operating companies desired to extend services from London Bridge station into new stations at Cannon Street and Blackfriars in the City and link to the West End at Charing Cross Station. This required a viaduct, but legally, it was impossible by the 1756 Borough Market Act for the Trustees to alienate their property. The compromise was that only a flying leasehold was given to the railway company for the permanent way, but only for as long as a railway operates on it. The Market continues to trade underneath the arches of the viaduct. Each time there is a railway expansion requiring widening of the viaduct, the Trustees receive a full compensation payment.

Most recently, as part of the Thameslink Programme, a large number of listed buildings in the Borough Market area have been altered or demolished. The market building on Bedale Street south-side has had its upper floors removed, as has the Wheatsheaf public house on Stoney Street, for the new railway bridge to cross over them. The remaining floors have been re-occupied. The old Market glazed roof on Stoney Street has been re-instated and cleaned. A significant loss was the Smirke Terrace, Nos 16–26 Borough High Street, demolished in 2010.

See also
 Farmers' market

References

External links

 Borough Market
 Photos market
 Borough Market photograph tour
 List of Borough Market traders online
 History of Borough Market

Retail markets in London
Buildings and structures in the London Borough of Southwark
Tourist attractions in the London Borough of Southwark